BBPR was an architectural partnership founded in Milan, Italy in 1932.

Partnership
The BBPR studio was formed in Milan in 1932 in a climate described by Giorgio Ciucci as “oscillating between differing and contrasting positions.” The name of the firm was an acronym derived from the first letter of each of the partners' family name:  (1910–1945),  (1909–2004),  (1908–1976), and Ernesto Nathan Rogers (1909–1969).

Their contribution to the development of Rationalism is evident not only in their architecture but in their involvement with MIAR and the journal Quadrante born as a rival to Casabella.  Their work held general appeal and was also appreciated and promoted by Edoardo Persico and Giuseppe Pagano at Casabella.  Along with the editor Valentino Bompiani, the BBPR group is credited for the original idea for the Italian Civilisation building.  The selection of the Guerrini-La Padula-Romano project was fraught with polemics since it is argued that their eulogy to the most Roman of architectural motif - the arch - is what won them first prize, a prize which some say deservedly belonged to the Milanese architects.  Their adherence to Fascism was short-lived and they soon became members of the resistance: Banfi and Belgiojoso were imprisoned at the Mauthausen concentration camp where Banfi died and Rogers, being of Jewish descent, was forced into exile in Switzerland.The practice continued under the same name after the Second World War despite the death of Banfi in Mauthausen concentration camp.
The firm came to notice after World War II with the abstract design for the Monument to the Victims of Nazi Concentration Camps, erected within the Cimitero Monumentale di Milano. Located in the centre of an open plaza, its white, tubular frame encloses a glass cube that holds a mess tin containing blood-soaked earth from the Mauthausen-Gusen concentration camp in Austria. Panels of black and white marble bear inscriptions about martyrdom and persecution, justice and freedom. Around the Monument, a series of tombstone-shaped plaques show an alphabetical list of names of Milanesi who died in concentration camps.

BBPR reacted against the polemic of the International Style in 1954, with the creation of the Torre Velasca in Milan, complete with its abstract medieval references. The tower responds to its prominent location near the Milan Cathedral in the city's historic centre.

The firm were subsequently employed to create new interior spaces and exhibition designs for the museums housed within Milan's Castello Sforzesco, which had been severely damaged by allied bombing in 1943.

Buildings and projects
1933 - House of Saturday for the newlyweds at the V Triennale di Milano (with Piero Portaluppi; - demolished) 
1934 - Various rooms at the Italian Aeronautical Exhibition. 
1935 - Building for homes and offices owned by Feltrinelli 
1935 - Hall of tennis and Hall of motoring at the National Sport Exhibition 
1937 - Rice deposits and nursery school in the province of Vercelli 
1938 - Eliotherapy colony, Legnano 
1938 - Town planning and study of the pavilions for the new Trade Fair, Milan (project) 
1939-1941 - Palazzo delle Poste at E42, via Ludwig Beethoven, Rome 
1945 - Milan City Plan, known as AR 
1948 - Perego-owned residential and office building, Milan
1951 - INA-Casa district in Cesate, Milan 
1954 - Exhibition hall for Olivetti in Fifth Avenue, New York 
1954 - Pavilion The children's labyrinth at the 10th Milan Triennale (demolished) 
1956 - Restoration and refurbishment of the Sforzesco Castle, Milan 
1958 - Torre Velasca in piazza Velasca, Milan - (IN / ARCH Award for a completed work - 1961
1959 - Office and residential building between piazza Statuto and Corso Francia, Turin  
1960 - E. Ritter house in Stintino
1961 - Velarca, the 19-meter boat house anchored along the western shore of Lake Como 
1963 - Residential building in via Vigna, Milan
1964 - Hispano-Olivetti building in Ronda de la Universidad, Barcelona 
1964 - Piezometric tower in via Morane, Modena 
1965 - Headquarters of the Italian Commercial Bank (today Banca Intesa), via Mariano Stabile, Palermo 
1967 - Case Andreatta in Pinzolo 
1968 - New India Assurance residential and tertiary building in Bombay 
1969 - Headquarters of the Giornale di Sicilia, via Lincoln, Palermo 
1969 - Office building (Chase Manhattan Bank) in Piazza Meda in Milan 
1970 - Hotel in Capoliveri, Elba Island 
1970 - Building between corso Buenos Aires, via Piccinni and via Monteverdi, Milan 
1971 - Cinema Mediolanum in Corso Vittorio Emanuele, Milan 
1973 - Museum-monument to the political and racial deportee in the Castello dei Pio, Carpi 
1974 - Palazzo Amoroso, Santo Spirito square, Palermo 
1975 - University of Calabria in Arcavacata 
1978 - Shopping center in Riyadh, Saudi Arabia
1980 - Hotel and party hall in the Casino of St. Vincent 
1981 - Residential and office buildings in piazza Maciachini, in via Fetonte, in S. Siro, Milan and Bruzzano 
1983 - Building for a chemical-pharmaceutical industry in Egypt 
1987 - S. Bortolo Hospital 5th lot, Vicenza 
1988 - Restoration of Villa Castiglioni in Magenta 
1989 - Chemical-pharmaceutical complex, Bari 
1990 - ATM headquarters in via Monte Rosa in Milan 
1991 - Renovation plan of the Old City of Kuwait 
1994 - Complex for the University of Studies in the Annunziata area, Messina 
1994 - Restoration of the Palazzo Reale as the seat of the Museum of Contemporary Art, Milan

Gallery

Publications 

 Fiori Leonardo, Pizzon Massimo (a cura di): B.B.P.R. La Torre Velasca, Abitare Segesta, 1982.
 Piva Antonio (a cura di): B.B.P.R. a Milano, Electa, 1982.
 Società generale immobiliare: Torre Velasca, 26 piani, 800 locali, Società generale immobiliare, 1958.
 Brunetti F.: La Torre Velasca a Milano, Alinea, 1999.
 Rogers E. N.: Il senso della storia, Unicopli, 1999.
 Marcello, Flavia, "Problems of Abstraction. BBPR’s Monument to the Fallen in Concentration Camps, Milan (1946, 1950, 1955)” in K. B. Jones and S. Pilat (eds.) The Routledge companion to Italian Fascist architecture : reception and legacy. Routledge, New York, 2020, 491–506.

References

 

Architecture firms of Italy
Construction and civil engineering companies of Italy
Defunct companies of Italy
Companies based in Milan
Construction and civil engineering companies established in 1932
Italian companies established in 1932
Olivetti people